Barbar Bhatti (born 14 February 1949), also spelled Babar Bhatti is a British actor of Pakistani origin. He is best known for the part of punkah wallah Rumzan in the BBC sitcom It Ain't Half Hot Mum, his first role.

Filmography

Film

Television

References

External links
 

1949 births
Living people
British people of Pakistani descent
British male actors